Gabelian was a region and family of the old Armenia c. 400–800.

The rulers about 451 were Arten Gabelian, Khosrow Gabelian; c. 480 were Saton Gabelian and Khosro Gabelian.

See also
List of regions of old Armenia

Early medieval Armenian regions